The Buzzards Bay 14 is an American sailboat that was designed by L. Francis Herreshoff and first built in 1940.

The Buzzards Bay 14 is a scaled-up development of the Herreshoff 12½, which was designed by L. Francis Herreshoff's father, Nathanael Greene Herreshoff.

Production
The design was commissioned by Llewllyn Howland and was intended to be built by the Concordia Company in the United States out of wood, but few were completed as the company concentrated on the Beetle Cat instead. In the mid-1980s production was commenced in fiberglass, with 17 boats completed by 1994.

Today the design is built in fiberglass by the Buzzards Bay Boat Shop of North Falmouth, Massachusetts and from wood by Artisan Boatworks in Rockport, Maine.

Design
The Buzzards Bay 14 is an open recreational keelboat with a foredeck. It has been built of wood or, more recently, of fiberglass, with wood trim. It has a fractional rig with wooden or  aluminum spars.  The hull has a spooned raked stem, an angled transom, a keel-mounted rudder controlled by a tiller and a fixed long keel, with a slightly cutaway forefoot. The wooden version displaces  and carries  of encapsulated lead ballast, while the fiberglass version displaces .

Operational history
In a 1994 review Richard Sherwood wrote about the fiberglass version, "there is a wood “feel” to the boat, as all seats, seat backs and other trim are teak, and fittings are either wood or bronze. Wood spars are an option to the standard painted aluminum. Sails include the main, with one set of reef points. The jib is club-footed, and optional sails are available. There are two locking compartments, and storage under hinged seats is available as an option."

See also
List of sailing boat types

Related development
Herreshoff 12½

Similar sailboats
Holder 17
Siren 17
Vagabond 17

References

External links

Keelboats
1940s sailboat type designs
Sailing yachts
Sailboat type designs by L. Francis Herreshoff
Sailboat types built by Concordia Company
Sailboat types built by Buzzards Bay Boat Shop
Sailboat types built by Artisan Boatworks